Vitaly Yakovlevich Vulf (Russian: Вита́лий Я́ковлевич Вульф, 23 May 1930 – 13 March 2011) was a Russian art, drama, film critic, literary critic, translator, TV and radio broadcaster and critic.

Biography 
Vitaly Vulf was born in Baku, where his father Yakov (who died in January 1956) was a lawyer. Vulf's mother, Helen Yelena Belenkaya, graduated from Baku University and was a teacher of Russian language. She died in 1974.

Vitaly Yakovlevich dreamed of going to GITIS. However, his father insisted that he received a serious education. So after graduating from high school Vitaly Vulf enrolled at the Moscow State University law school. However, owing to Antisemitism, Vitaly Vulf could not obtained a position as a lawyer. For the same reason he failed to obtain admission to the graduate school, in spite of getting straight A's on the admission exams in 1955.

Death
Vulf died in Moscow on March 13, 2011 at the age of 80.

References 

1930 births
2011 deaths
Soviet Jews
Russian Jews
Burials in Troyekurovskoye Cemetery
Moscow State University alumni
Recipients of the Order "For Merit to the Fatherland", 3rd class
Recipients of the Order "For Merit to the Fatherland", 4th class
New York University faculty
Russian art historians
Soviet television presenters
Russian television presenters
Russian theatre critics
Russian film critics
Deaths from prostate cancer
Deaths from cancer in Russia
Soviet theatre critics